Zhang Shuo (born January 5, 1984, in Liaoning) is a Chinese rhythmic gymnast. She won the individual/group gold medal at the 2002 Asian Games.

She represented China at the 2008 Summer Olympics and won a silver medal in the group competition.

References
 
 

1984 births
Living people
Chinese rhythmic gymnasts
Gymnasts at the 2008 Summer Olympics
Olympic gymnasts of China
Olympic silver medalists for China
Gymnasts from Liaoning
Olympic medalists in gymnastics
Medalists at the 2008 Summer Olympics
Asian Games medalists in gymnastics
Gymnasts at the 2002 Asian Games
Gymnasts at the 2004 Summer Olympics
Asian Games gold medalists for China
Medalists at the 2002 Asian Games
21st-century Chinese women